The departure of US troops from Iraq in 2011 ended the  period of occupation that had begun with  the U.S.-led invasion in March 2003. The time since U.S. withdrawal has been marked by a renewed  Iraqi insurgency and by a spillover of the Syrian civil war into Iraq. By 2013, the insurgency escalated into a renewed war, the central government of Iraq being opposed by ISIL and various factions, primarily radical Sunni forces during the early phase of the conflict. The war ended in 2017 with an Iraqi government and allied victory, however ISIL continues a low-intensity insurgency in remote parts of the country.

ISIL forces seized the majority of Al Anbar Governorate, including the cities of Fallujah, Al Qaim, Abu Ghraib and (in May 2015) Ramadi, leaving them in control of 90% of Anbar. Tikrit, Mosul and most of the Nineveh Governorate, along with parts of Salahuddin, Kirkuk and Diyala Governorates, were seized by insurgent forces in the June 2014 offensive. ISIL captured Sinjar and a number of other towns in the August 2014 offensive, but Sinjar became a contested city in December 2014.

Insurgency (2011–2013) 

Sectarian violence continued in the first half of 2013 with at least 56 people killed in April when a Sunni protest in Hawija was interrupted by a government-supported helicopter raid. On 20 May 2013, at least 95 people died in a wave of car bomb attacks that was preceded by a car bombing on 15 May that led to 33 deaths; also, on 18 May, 76 people were killed in the Sunni areas of Baghdad.
On 22 July 2013, at least five hundred convicts, most of whom were senior members of al-Qaida who had received death sentences, broke out of Iraq's Abu Ghraib jail when comrades launched a military-style assault to free them. The attack began when a suicide bomber drove a car packed with explosives into prison gates. James F. Jeffrey, the United States ambassador in Baghdad when the last American troops exited, said the assault and resulting escape  "will provide seasoned leadership and a morale boost to Al Qaeda and its allies in both Iraq and Syria ... it is likely to have an electrifying impact on the Sunni population in Iraq, which has been sitting on the fence."

War (2013–2017) 

By mid-2014 the country was in chaos with a new government yet to be formed following national elections, and the insurgency reaching new heights. In early June 2014 the Islamic State in Iraq and the Levant (ISIS) took over the cities of Mosul and Tikrit and said it was ready to march on Baghdad, while Iraqi Kurdish forces took control of key military installations in the major oil city of Kirkuk. Prime Minister Nouri al-Maliki asked his parliament to declare a state of emergency that would give him increased powers, but the lawmakers refused.

In summer 2014 U.S. President Obama announced a renewed military intervention in the form of aerial support, with the aim of halting the advance of ISIS forces and rendering humanitarian aid to stranded refugees and stabilize the political situation.

Since June 2014, al-Maliki had faced growing pressure to resign, including from the United States.  In July 2014, the Kurdistan Region demanded his resignation, and his own party (the Islamic Dawa Party) began looking for a new leader.

On 14 August 2014, Prime Minister Nouri al-Maliki succumbed to the pressure at home and abroad to step down.  Iraq's new president, Fuad Masum, appointed a new prime minister, Haider al-Abadi on 19 August 2014. However, for the appointment to take effect, al-Abadi needed to form a government and be confirmed by Parliament, within 30 days.  After initially expressing opposition to al-Abadi's selection, al-Maliki endorsed al-Abadi and said he would not stand in the way.

In what was claimed to be revenge for the aerial bombing ordered by President Obama, ISIL, which by this time had changed their name to the Islamic State, beheaded an American journalist, James Foley, who had been kidnapped two years previously. Despite U.S. bombings and breakthroughs on the political front, Iraq remained in chaos with the Islamic State consolidating its gains, and sectarian violence continuing unabated. On 22 August 2014, suspected Shia militants opened fire on a Sunni mosque during Friday prayers, killing 70 worshipers. Separately, Iraqi forces in helicopters killed 30 Sunni fighters in the town of Dhuluiya. A day later, apparently in retaliation for the attack on the mosque, three bombings across Iraq killed 35 people.

Kurdistan Region has participated in fighting ISIL, while also taking other territory (such as Kirkuk). Since August 2014, the U.S. has also been bombing ISIL positions. In late January 2015, Iraqi forces recaptured the entire province of Diyala from the Islamic State.
On 2 March, Second Battle of Tikrit began. and after more than a month of hard fighting, Iranians, Iraqis and Shiite militia overcame ISIL fighters and took Tikrit. This success was off-set in late May, by ISIL's capture of the provincial capital of Ramadi in Anbar Governorate.

Iraqi Prime Minister, Haider al-Abadi officially announced the liberation of the city of Mosul from the control of the Islamic State of Iraq and the Levant on 10 July 2017.

Parliamentary elections (2018) 

Parliamentary elections were held on 12 May 2018. Kurdish politician, Barham Salih was elected as president by parliament in October 2018. Former Finance Minister Adil Abdul-Mahdi was selected to form a new government. The new government was approved by the Council of Representatives on 24 October 2018.

2018–19 protests 

Protests over deteriorating economic conditions and state corruption started in July 2018 in Baghdad and  other major Iraqi cities, mainly in the central and southern provinces. The latest nationwide protests, erupting in October 2019, had a death toll of at least 93 people, including police.

2020- 

In November 2021, Iraqi Prime Minister Mustafa al-Kadhimi survived a failed assassination attempt.

Cleric Muqtada al-Sadr’s Sadrist Movement was the biggest winner in the 2021 parliamentary elections.  Governmental stalemate lead to the 2022 Iraqi political crisis.

In October 2022, Abdul Latif Rashid was elected as the new President of Iraq after winning the parliamentary election against incumbent Barham Salih, who was running for a second term. The presidency is largely ceremonial and is traditionally held by a Kurd.

On 27 October 2022, Mohammed Shia al-Sudani, close ally of former Prime Minister Nouri al-Maliki, took the office to succeed  Mustafa al-Kadhimi as new Prime Minister of Iraq, the most powerful post in the country.

See also 
 Iraqi insurgency (2011–2013)
 Northern Iraq offensive (June 2014)
 Northern Iraq offensive (August 2014)
 Arab Winter
 2018 Iraqi parliamentary election
 History of Iraq

References 

History of Iraq (1958–present)